Sean McCann (September 24, 1935 – June 13, 2019) was a Canadian actor and was in the business for over 55 years. He was best known for his roles as Lt. Jim Hogan in the 1985 CBS television drama series Night Heat (1985–1989), Frank Rittenhauer in the comedy film Tommy Boy (1995) and the Judge in Chicago (2002).

A recipient of the Earle Grey Award for his lifetime achievement in television, Sean McCann appeared in over 150 movies, television programs and plays.

Early life
McCann was born in Windsor, Ontario, on September 24, 1935, the son of Alta (née Tobin) and Jack McCann.

Career

Notable roles and awards
McCann was in The Law of Enclosures, with Sarah Polley and Diane Ladd. He appeared with Meryl Streep (...First Do No Harm), Nick Nolte (Affliction) and Chris Farley (Tommy Boy). He shared screen time with Brenda Fricker and Miranda Richardson in Swann (for which McCann received a Best Performance by an Actor in a Supporting Role Genie nomination), Nicolas Cage in Trapped in Paradise, Kevin Bacon in The Air Up There, Sam Waterston in A House Divided, Peter Weller and Judy Davis in Naked Lunch (which garnered a National Film Critics Society award), Brooke Shields and the late Al Waxman in What Makes a Family, and Kurt Russell in Miracle. He appeared in the movie  Hank Williams: The Show He Never Gave (made for Canadian TV, December, 1980).

In 1980, he starred in the second season of the nationally syndicated American situation comedy, The Baxters.  On the series, McCann played Jim Baxter, a middle-class father of three children living in a suburb of St. Louis.  Originally produced by Norman Lear in its first season, the series was the first "interactive sitcom" of its kind, wherein the first half of each 30-minute episode presented a vignette dramatizing the events in the lives of the Baxter family, and the second half was an "instant analysis" talk show segment, giving a live studio audience and guests an opportunity to express their opinions about the topic being presented that week.

In 1999, he won a Gemini Award for Best Guest Actor in a Series for Power Play. McCann was twice nominated for a Gemini Award for Best Performance in a Pre-School Series, for 1998's beloved Noddy as Grandpa Noah Tomten. McCann was singled out at the 1987 Gemini Awards with a Best Supporting Actor nomination for his recurring role in Night Heat. McCann also starred in Robert Lepage's Genie-award winning Possible Worlds, and appeared in the Golden Globe-nominated Small Sacrifices with Farrah Fawcett. In addition, McCann worked with such legendary directors as Sidney Lumet, Ken Russell, David Green, Paul Schrader and David Cronenberg.

In 1988, he took on a role he spoke of most fondly - Prime Minister William Lyon Mackenzie King in The King Chronicle. Directed by the renowned Canadian documentarian Donald Brittain, the mini-series was a 6-hour CBC and NFB co-production that aired to great popular and critical acclaim. One year later, McCann joined the ranks of such celebrated performers as Lorne Greene, Kate Reid and Gordon Pinsent, when he won the Earle Grey Award.

He also appeared in the Toronto Fringe Festival production of Bad Skater, Good Hands.

Other interests
McCann studied at St. Peter's Seminary in London, Ontario to prepare himself for the priesthood.

A baseball fan since the days of his youth, McCann served as an amateur Associate Scout with the Toronto Blue Jays since their early years, spoke often about baseball to professional organizations, and was named to the Board of Directors of the Canadian Baseball Hall of Fame.

McCann ran as an Ontario Liberal Party candidate in the 1977 Ontario general election, against Roy McMurtry in the electoral district of Eglinton.

Personal life
From 1968 until his death in 2019, he was married to Andrée Paquet for 51 years, and he had five children.

Death
McCann died on June 13, 2019 in Toronto, Ontario, at the age of 83 from heart failure brought about by a heart disease he had suffered through most of his life.

Legacy
After his death, a song from Noddy "Thank You for Being You" was published on YouTube in his honor on June 29, 2019, uploaded by YouTuber Joseph Marshall, who had uploaded episodes from the show on YouTube on March through June 1, 2020, with the permission of the show's creator Rick Siggelkow.

Filmography

Film

Television

References

External links

1935 births
2019 deaths
Male actors from Windsor, Ontario
Canadian male film actors
Canadian male stage actors
Canadian male television actors
Canadian male voice actors
Canadian people of Irish descent
20th-century Canadian male actors
21st-century Canadian male actors
Ontario Liberal Party candidates in Ontario provincial elections